The 2015 Marian Knights football team was an American football team that represented Marian University as a member of the Mid-States Football Association during the 2015 NAIA football season. In their third season under head coach Mark Henninger, the Knights compiled a 12–2 record (5–1 against conference opponents) and won the NAIA national championship, defeating , 31–14, in the NAIA National Championship Game.

Schedule

References

Marian Knights
Marian Knights football seasons
NAIA Football National Champions
|Marian Knights football